European route E66 is a part of the International E-road network. This Class A intermediate west-east route runs  from Franzensfeste in Italy to Székesfehérvár in Hungary, connecting the Alps with the Pannonian Plain.

Itinerary 

The E 66 routes through three European countries:

 
 : Franzensfeste (with connection to European route E45) - Innichen - Winnebach
 
 : Arnbach - Silian - Lienz - Oberdrauburg - Spittal an der Drau
 : Spittal an der Drau - Villach
 : Villach - Klagenfurt - Graz - Ilz
 : A2 (Ilz) - Fürstenfeld
 : Fürstenfeld - Heiligenkreuz im Lafnitztal
 
 : Rábafüzes/Szentgotthárd - Körmend - Veszprém - Székesfehérvár.

Hungary requested in October 2011 that E66 should be extended from Székesfehérvár via Dunaújváros - Kecskemét to Szolnok.
 This has not taken effect, so in 2019 Hungary requested the same extension Székesfehérvár – Szolnok again.

References

External links 
 UN Economic Commission for Europe: Overall Map of E-road Network (2007)

66
E066
E066
E066